New Creek Blockhouse, was built about 1 mile west of New Creek to protect local settlers in 1750. The fortification consisted of a log blockhouse but without a stockade around it.

When the French and Indian War began in earnest in 1755, the New Creek valley was well populated, so there was a need for a defense in the event of Indian attacks. Fort Ashby and Fort Nicholas at present Cresaptown, Maryland were too far away to be of practical use.

The location of the blockhouse was in the area of G Street in present Keyser, West Virginia

Landmarks in West Virginia
Buildings and structures in Mineral County, West Virginia
French and Indian War forts
Colonial forts in West Virginia
Blockhouses